War Gods is a fighting video game originally released to arcades by Midway Games in 1996. Ports for the Nintendo 64, PlayStation and Windows were released in 1997. In the game, players control one of ten fighters who have been given great power by a mysterious ore that crashed-landed on Earth from outer space. The object of the game is to defeat all the other fighters to become the most powerful warrior on the planet.

The game was heavily influenced by Midway's Mortal Kombat series, and features controls similar to the Mortal Kombat games, as well as the series' signature fatalities. Unique to War Gods is the "3D" button, allowing users to use the background/foreground for additional attacks and evasive maneuvers. The game's graphics were created using a technology by Midway called "digital skin", which mapped photographs onto 3D models.

War Gods received mixed reviews, with particular criticism being directed at the game's character design and animations.

Gameplay

The game plays similarly to Mortal Kombat 4, using an almost identical button layout of high/low punches and kicks. The "Run" button was replaced with a "3D" button that, when held down while using other joystick and button combinations, allows the player to perform different attacks/evasions utilizing the background or foreground. To prevent situations where opponents end up on different playing fields for prolonged periods of time, each character has a teleport move which moves them close to their opponent. Just as in the Mortal Kombat games, players select a character and fight a series of opponents. War Gods also features combos which can be used through series of button presses. Like the Mortal Kombat games, the game has fatalities that are used to finish off opponents.

Plot
Many, many years ago, a spaceship carrying precious life-giving ore crashes to Earth. The chunks of ore scatter across the planet, and over the years, ten humans each find a stone of the ore, and are transformed into powerful beings, War Gods. And now, they are fighting each other to possess all the stones and become the ultimate super-warrior. To do this the player must beat the other 9 fighters, and a clone of the character the player has chosen, before going on to fight the sub-boss, Grox, and the main boss, Exor.

Development
Released by Midway as the first of its new 3D software prior to the release of Mortal Kombat 4, War Gods was developed by a team led by Joe Linhoff and George Petro. The arcade game utilized a hybrid of the hardware used for Cruis'n USA with a hard drive for data storage. All the moves were recorded using motion capture with just two actors. The in-game characters were created using a technology called "digital skin", which involved digitizing reference photographs of live actors and mapping them onto 3-D models.

War Gods was unveiled at a trade show in March 1996. In response to suggestions and complaints about the gameplay, several months were devoted to refining the game's programming, delaying the arcade release to the third quarter of 1996.

War Gods adopted Mortal Kombat's fighting style, but was created independently and never achieved the success of Mortal Kombat. The game boasted a "3D button" that lets fighters dive around the ring, in a circular arc, as part of their attacks and defensive moves. The orbiting camera smoothly follows the fighters, working to maintain the left/right "fighting line" needed for coherent two-player joystick control on the arcade cabinet.

The Nintendo 64 version was delayed in order to tone down the difficulty level and add additional moves. A Panasonic M2 version of War Gods was in development and slated to be one of its launch titles, but it never happened due to the system's cancellation.

Reception

The response to War Gods was lukewarm. One of the biggest criticisms the game received was for its cast of characters. Computer and Video Games reported that while the arcade game was being exhibited at the 1996 American Coin Machine Exposition, showgoers believed that the character designs would hurt the game's chances for success. Matt Casamassina of IGN called the character designs "uninspired", while a reviewer for Next Generation called them "mildly embarrassing Ringling Brothers' character design". Game Revolution, however, said the character designs were "pretty cool" and complimented the variety in the available fighters.

The response to the game's graphics was mixed. Computer and Video Games had a positive impression of the in-game models with "digital skin". Next Generation said the digital skin technique is genuinely innovative and different, but the end result is characters which look jagged, move stiffly, and generally lack the smoothness of the polygonal fighters seen in contemporary games like Tekken 2 and Virtua Fighter 2. Commenting on the Nintendo 64 version, Jeff Gerstmann of GameSpot called it "probably the first N64 fighting game to hit the market that actually shows off some of the power of this system." However, most reviewers said the game makes poor use of the N64 hardware, citing choppy character animations, a low frame rate, poorly detailed characters, and slowdown. Casamassina wrote that the while the digital skin textures were "initially nice", the "animation and terrible character design detract greatly from the whole experience."

IGN said they were "pleased with the control in the game, but not overly excited by it." GamePro remarked that "The 3D button, while innovative, really doesn't enhance the gameplay" and is too easily confused with low guard on the N64 controller. Reviewers also commented that the game's controls were ill-suited for the N64 controller, though Next Generation contended that the controls are more intuitive with the N64 controller than they were in the arcade. The Nintendo 64 version was also criticized for having imbalanced A.I. Reviewers highlighted the fact that the game plays very similarly to the Mortal Kombat games. Gerstmann commented that there was "just enough of the MK feel to give it familiarity" calling it "an interesting footnote to the MK legacy." After seeing the game demoed at the American Coin Machine Exposition, a Next Generation writer said it was "the next step forward for Midway's Mortal Kombat series (though it's not technically Mortal Kombat)." The magazine's later review of the game, however, criticized that too many of the fighters' moves are obvious parallels to moves seen in the Mortal Kombat series. Sushi-X of Electronic Gaming Monthly (EGM) likewise judged that the overt similarity to Mortal Kombat makes the game "horribly unoriginal." EGM named it the 1997 "Game That Should've Stayed in the Arcades" in their 1998 Video Game Buyer's Guide, commenting that "an average arcade game doesn't make for a great home game, War Gods is no exception."

Next Generation and Crispin Boyer of EGM noted that the Nintendo 64 version was actually enhanced over the arcade version, with faster gameplay, better anti-aliasing, and bosses which were tuned to present a more reasonable challenge, but both felt these enhancements were not enough to make the game good. GamePro assessed that the game compared unfavorably, not only to the top tier fighting games on the Saturn and PlayStation, but even to middling N64 fighters such as Killer Instinct Gold and Mortal Kombat Trilogy.

War Gods flopped in arcades, owing chiefly to limited distribution and unfavorable word of mouth.

See also 
Bio F.R.E.A.K.S.
Mace: The Dark Age
Mortal Kombat 4

References

External links
War Gods  at Eurocom

1996 video games
3D fighting games
Arcade video games
Cancelled Panasonic M2 games
Fighting games
Midway video games
Mortal Kombat clones
Multiplayer and single-player video games
Nintendo 64 games
PlayStation (console) games
Video games developed in the United States
Windows games
GT Interactive games
Eurocom games